The Berkeley Political Review is a semesterly, nonpartisan political magazine and website founded at the University of California, Berkeley shortly after September 11th, 2001. Through printed publications and multimedia projects, the Review covers international and domestic political affairs. Submissions are limited; to write for, edit, or otherwise staff the magazine, undergraduate students must apply at the beginning of each semester.

The Berkeley Political Review is notable for being the first journal based out of a public university to join the Alliance of Collegiate Editors, whose members include political reviews at Brown, Harvard, Stanford, and Columbia, among others. Members of the Review have also hosted or co-hosted a number of debates, interviews, and panels, including engagements with Barbara Lee, Alex Chow, Sergio Fajardo, Richard Muller, Andrea Saul, and Dennis Prager.

Editorial Board
The Editorial Board for the 2022 to 2023 academic year is:

 Editors in Chief: Adena Ajike, and Juliette Lovell
 Deputy Editor in Chief: Aaron Hill
 Senior California Editor: Maya Cook
 Deputy California Editors: Amanda Khodabash and Jack Galloway
 Senior United States Editor: Sanjana Manjeshwar
 Deputy United States Editors: Aayush Singh and Jenessa Henderson
 Senior World Editors: Kit Beyer, Andy Beyer, and Bim-Ray Yau
 Senior Opinion Editors: Charlynn Teter and Ryan Liu
 Deputy Opinion Editor: Ryan Abbasi
 Senior Online Editor: Jordan Murphy
 Deputy Online Editors: Michelle Yuxin Wang and Zachary Hagen-Smith

Notable alumni
 Shane Goldmacher (editor), national political reporter for The New York Times; former chief White House correspondent for Politico.
 Christine Mai-Duc (editor), reporter for The Wall Street Journal; former staff writer for the Los Angeles Times.
 Adora Svitak (editor-in-chief), journalist, author, public speaker, and activist

See also
 The Brown Spectator
 The Stanford Review
 Brown Political Review
 Columbia Political Review
 Harvard Political Review
 Berkeley Forum

References

External links
 Berkeley Political Review homepage

2001 establishments in California
Biannual magazines published in the United States
Magazines established in 2001
Magazines published in California
Political magazines published in the United States
Student magazines published in the United States
University of California, Berkeley
Mass media in Berkeley, California